Liubangosaurus (meaning "Liubang lizard", after the name of the holotype locality) is a genus of sauropod dinosaur that lived during the Early Cretaceous in what is now China. The type and only species is Liubangosaurus hei, first described by Mo Jinyou, Xu Xing and Eric Buffetaut in 2010. Liubangosaurus is known from the holotype NHMG8152, five nearly complete and articulated middle-caudal dorsal vertebrae that were collected from the Xinlong Formation in Fusui County, Guangxi Province. Jinyou et al. (2010) found that Liubangosaurus belonged to the clade Eusauropoda.

A 2013 comprehensive analysis of basal titanosauriforms found Liubangosaurus to nest in the Somphospondyli, either in Euhelopodidae or Saltasauridae.

References

Early Cretaceous dinosaurs of Asia
Fossil taxa described in 2010
Taxa named by Xu Xing
Macronarians
Paleontology in Guangxi